Tomislav Barišić (born 6 March 1993) is a Bosnian professional footballer who plays as a right-back. He most recently played for Bosnian Premier League club Zrinjski Mostar.

Honours
Zagreb
2. HNL: 2013–14

References

External links
Tomislav Barišić at Sofascore

1993 births
Living people
People from Posušje
Croats of Bosnia and Herzegovina
Association football fullbacks
Bosnia and Herzegovina footballers
Bosnia and Herzegovina under-21 international footballers
NK Zagreb players
NK Rudeš players
FK Velež Mostar
NK Celje players
NK Lučko players
HŠK Zrinjski Mostar players
Croatian Football League players
First Football League (Croatia) players
Premier League of Bosnia and Herzegovina players
Slovenian PrvaLiga players
Bosnia and Herzegovina expatriate footballers
Expatriate footballers in Croatia
Bosnia and Herzegovina expatriate sportspeople in Croatia
Expatriate footballers in Slovenia
Bosnia and Herzegovina expatriate sportspeople in Slovenia